A scream queen (a wordplay on screen queen) is an actress who is prominent and influential in horror films, either through a notable appearance or recurring roles. A scream king is the male equivalent.

Definition
The term "scream queen" is more specifically used to refer to the "attractive young damsels-in-distress" characters that have appeared in a number of films in the horror genre. Lloyd Kaufman, co-founder of Troma Entertainment, noted that being a scream queen is "more than just crying and having ketchup thrown on you. You not only have to be attractive, but you also have to have a big brain. You have to be frightened, you have to be sad, you have to be romantic."

Debbie Rochon, often described as a scream queen herself, wrote in an article originally published in GC Magazine that "a true Scream Queen isn't The Perfect Woman. She's sexy, seductive, but most importantly 'attainable' to the average guy. Or so it would seem." And although the earlier scream queens might be women that "just had to look pretty and shriek a lot until the hero of the film got around to save (them)", the later scream queens "showcase women worrying about something other than a guy...unless said guy is the one trying to kill them", with some of them "wreaking vengeance" by defeating the villain.

History

Beginnings
The prominence of women in horror films dates back to the silent film era, with films such as The Cabinet of Dr. Caligari (1920) and Nosferatu (1922). George Feltenstein, film historian and senior vice president of theatrical catalog marketing at Warner Home Video, states, "Women screaming in terror has been a Hollywood mainstay — even when films were silent".

1970s

Four actresses in the 1970s became seminal examples of a "scream queen" for the decade: 
Sandra Peabody, who portrayed Mari Collingwood in The Last House on the Left (1972), Marilyn Burns, who portrayed Sally Hardesty in The Texas Chain Saw Massacre (1974), Olivia Hussey, who portrayed Jess Bradford in Black Christmas (1974), and Jamie Lee Curtis, who portrayed Laurie Strode in Halloween (1978).

After The Last House on the Left, Peabody went on to appear in the horror films Voices of Desire (1972), Massage Parlor Murders (1973), Case of the Full Moon Murders (1973), and Legacy of Satan (1974). Burns followed her performance in The Texas Chainsaw Massacre with roles in Helter Skelter (1976) and Eaten Alive (1977). In Halloween, Jamie Lee Curtis, daughter of Psycho actress Janet Leigh, had her first film role. Portraying Laurie Strode in Halloween, Curtis has been called the "ultimate 'scream queen'" and was even referenced as such in the horror film Scream (1996) by character Randy Meeks. Curtis went on to star in several other horror films after that, including The Fog and Halloween H20: 20 Years Later, both of which also include Leigh.

Dee Wallace appeared in Wes Craven's 1977 horror film The Hills Have Eyes before going onto establish herself as a scream queen in the 80s by appearing in The Howling (1981), Cujo (1983) and Critters (1986). 

Daria Nicolodi played the role of the scream queen in most of her films (Deep Red, Inferno, Phenomena, Terror at the Opera). Also Mario Bava called on Nicolodi for Shock (1977). In 1982, Nicolodi played Anne in Dario Argento's Tenebrae.

Veronica Cartwright was also a prominent scream queen of the 1970s, appearing in the 1978 remake of Invasion of the Body Snatchers as well as Alien in 1979. She began her career as a scream queen in Alfred Hitchcock’s The Birds.

1980s
The success of Halloween revived slasher films during the late 1970s and 1980s. Examples include Terror Train and Prom Night, in which Jamie Lee Curtis would again play the scream queen; Friday the 13th, the first entry to have both a female antagonist (Betsy Palmer) and protagonist (Adrienne King); and A Nightmare on Elm Street, now considered a slasher classic, which introduced supernatural serial killer Freddy Krueger, and whose leading actress, Heather Langenkamp, was dubbed a scream queen, and went on to become one of the most influential. Linnea Quigley also became a scream queen during the 1980s, appearing specifically in low-budget and cult-classic films such as Silent Night, Deadly Night and Return of the Living Dead. Mark Patton, star of A Nightmare on Elm Street 2: Freddy's Revenge (1985), has in recent years been touted at horror conventions as mainstream horror's first "male scream queen". Bruce Campbell, lead actor of the Evil Dead franchise, has been branded as "the definitive scream king."

British actress Catriona MacColl became a scream queen after appearing in three Italian horror films directed by Lucio Fulci. City of the Living Dead (1980), The Beyond (1981) and House by the Cemetery (1981) have all gone on to gain a cult following.

Following her Saturn Award-nominated turn in Exorcist II: The Heretic, Oscar-nominee Linda Blair parlayed her classic 1973 The Exorcist role into a slew of 80s horror performances, including Hell Night, Witchery, Grotesque, and The Chilling. She would continue making horror films into the 1990s, with a cameo in Wes Craven's Scream and the lead role in the Australian thriller Dead Sleep. In 2008, at the Malaga Fantasy & Horror Film Festival, Blair received a lifetime achievement award for her work in the horror genre. After a long hiatus from horror films, Blair returned to form in Juliana Brafa's All Is Normal (2005) and the thriller Landfill (2021).

1990s
During the 1990s, Debbie Rochon starred in dozens of Troma Production horror films and was voted by Draculina magazine as its "Scream Queen of the Decade". Sheryl Lee played murder victims Laura Palmer and Maddy Ferguson in the TV series Twin Peaks (1990–91) and spin-off film Twin Peaks: Fire Walk with Me (1992) and has been described as a "scream queen", in particular for scenes in the otherworldly Black Lodge. Neve Campbell also began her career in horror with The Craft (1996), and later went on to star as Sidney Prescott in the Scream film series. Jennifer Love Hewitt was reckoned a scream queen after her I Know What You Did Last Summer films. The first film of that trilogy also had a starring role for Sarah Michelle Gellar, who went on to appear in other horror films made during the 1990s and new millennium, including Scream 2 and The Grudge film series.

2000s
In 2005, Shauna Macdonald starred in The Descent, which established her as a scream queen and for which she was nominated for the Saturn Award for Best Actress. Elisha Cuthbert starred in the horror film House of Wax (2005) and Captivity (2007), gaining the status by from films. In 2007, USA Today published an article listing on modern scream queens interviewing actresses Sheri Moon Zombie, Jaimie Alexander, Andrea Bogart, Mercedes McNab, Tiffany Shepis and Cerina Vincent. Since 2007 and her appearance in Halloween, Danielle Harris has increased her genre work, being subsequently called "horror's reigning scream queen" by the NY Daily News.

2010s
Bipasha Basu has been referred as "Bollywood's Scream Queen" due to her contributions to horror in India with her blockbuster horror movies like Raaz (2002) and Raaz 3D (2012).

In 2016, Screen Rant listed the "15 Greatest Scream Queens in Horror History", which includes Linda Blair, Danielle Harris, Lisa Wilcox, Vera Farmiga, Janet Leigh, Marilyn Burns, Veronica Cartwright, Neve Campbell, Naomi Watts, Heather Langenkamp, Eva Green, Chloë Grace Moretz, Sarah Michelle Gellar, Barbara Steele and Jamie Lee Curtis.

Indonesian actress Tara Basro has been described as a "scream queen" for her roles in Joko Anwar's films Satan's Slaves (2017) and Impetigore (2019).

2020s
Jenna Ortega starred in the slasher films X and Scream (both 2022), establishing herself as a scream queen. Ortega would reprise her Scream role for the sequel, Scream VI (2023). Melissa Barrera is also considered to be a scream queen, having starred in the slasher Scream (2022) and the sequel Scream VI (2023) alongside Ortega and the horror thriller Bed Rest (2022).

Scream Queens Illustrated magazine

Scream Queens Illustrated magazine featured pictorials, interviews, reviews, and other content concerning such Hollywood scream queens as Barbara Bauer, Becky Sunshine, Tina Krause, Julia Hayes, Julie Strain, Monique Gabrielle, Brinke Stevens, Linnea Quigley, Rhonda Shear, Xenia Gratsos ("Brioni Farrell"), Lorissa McComas, June Wilkinson, Debbie Rochon, Sherri Frazer, Melissa Wolf, and Cassandra Peterson ("Elvira").

Scream king

More recently, the term "scream king" has been used to refer to male leading actors who have made their name through taking on leading roles in horror movies as a "final guy" character. Rachel Roth defines the rise of the "scream kings" as a result of moving away from formulas where men are typically cast as monsters for a female character to fight off and female actresses being cast less as victims and sometimes as the monster or villain themselves. Roth cites Bruce Campbell as an early example of a scream king for his role in the Evil Dead franchise. Other notable scream kings include Devon Sawa, known for Idle Hands and Final Destination; Patrick Wilson, who appeared in Annabelle Comes Home, Insidious, and The Conjuring; Evan Peters, the only male actor to appear in nine of the eleven seasons of American Horror Story; Daniel Kaluuya, for his performances in Get Out and Nope; Finn Wolfhard, for his roles in It and the Netflix series Stranger Things; and Shawn Roberts, who has appeared in zombie films such as Land of the Dead, Diary of the Dead, and the Resident Evil franchise.

List

See also
 Final girl
 Horror icon
 Invasion of the Scream Queens, a 1992 documentary
 Scream, Queen! My Nightmare on Elm Street, a 2019 documentary

References

Film and video terminology
Women in horror film